DeMille or De Mille is a surname. Notable people with the surname include:

Agnes De Mille, American dance and choreographer
Beatrice deMille, English-born American playwright and screenwriter
Cecil B. DeMille, American film director
Constance Adams DeMille, American actress
Evelyn de Mille (1919–2013), Canadian bookseller
Henry Churchill de Mille, American playwright
James De Mille, Canadian writer
Katherine DeMille, Canadian-born American actress
Nelson DeMille, American author
Oliver DeMille, American author and educator
Richard de Mille, American journalist and author
William C. deMille, American screenwriter and film director